Shriner's Convention was Ray Stevens' seventeenth studio album, released in 1980, as well as his first for RCA Records. The front of the album's cover shows a drawn picture of Stevens on a motorcycle with a young, curvaceous woman in back of him. Stevens wears a blue, Hawaiian-styled shirt and blue jeans, while the woman wears a bikini, and the two wear shriner hats. In the background of the picture, there is a shriner's parade on the streets. On the back of the album, there is a comic strip of happenings at a motel while the parade occurs.

The title track is the album's sole single.

Track listing

In the cassette version of the album, the tracks for "Last Laugh" and "Coin Machine" are reversed.

Album credits
Arranged and produced by: Ray Stevens at Ray Stevens Studio, Nashville, Tennessee
Engineer: Stuart Keathley
Cover concept: Jerry Bradley
Art direction and cartoon illustration: Herb Burnette
Lettering: Bill Noss
Graphics by: Pinwheel Studios, Nashville

Charts

Weekly charts

Year-end charts

Singles

References

1980 albums
Ray Stevens albums
RCA Records albums
Shriners